Mia Kokkini Grammi (Greek: Μια Κόκκινη Γραμμή; English: A Red Line) is the tenth studio album by Greek singer Natasa Theodoridou. It was released on 10 July 2009 by Sony Music Greece and received platinum certification in Greece, selling 12,000 units. The album was composed entirely by Giorgos Theofanous with Thanos Papanikolaou providing lyrics. It was released in discbox slider packaging and carried a fixed price of €9.90, roughly half the price of a typical album in the Greek market at the time. Theodoridou's lead single from the album "Mia Kokkini Grammi" peaked at number one on the Greek Radio Airplay chart.

Track listing

Credits
Credits adapted from liner notes.

Personnel 
Giannis Bithikotsis: baglama (tracks: 2, 5, 9) || bouzouki (tracks: 2, 4, 5, 8, 9) || cura (tracks: 2, 6)
Savvas Christodoulou: guitar (tracks: 2, 4, 5, 6, 8, 9, 10)
Akis Diximos: backing vocals (tracks: 2, 3, 7, 10) || second vocal (tracks: 4, 5, 8, 9)
Giorgos Galanos: orchestration, programming (tracks: 3)
Simos Kinalis: säz (tracks: 10)
Katerina Kiriakou: backing vocals (tracks: 2, 3, 7, 10)
Spiros Kontakis: guitar (tracks: 1, 3)
Kostas Liolios: drums (tracks: 1, 2, 4, 5, 6, 8, 9, 10)
Antonis Ntontos: saxophone (tracks: 6)
Giorgos Theofanous: orchestration, programming (tracks: 2, 5, 6)
Zoi Tiganouria: accordion (tracks: 2, 10)
Leonidas Tzitzos: orchestration, programming (tracks: 1, 4, 7, 8, 9 ,10)
Nikos Vardis: bass (tracks: 1, 2, 4, 5, 6, 8, 9, 10)

Production 
Vasilis Bouloubasis: hair styling
Tasos Chamosfakidis (Workshop studio): mix engineer, sound engineer
Dimitris Chorianopoulos (Workshop studio): mix engineer, sound engineer
Giannis Doulamis: production manager
Mirto Gkonou: art direction
Thodoris Ikonomou (Sofita studio): mix engineer, sound engineer (baglama, bouzouki, cura)
Giannis Ioannidis (D.P.H.): mastering
Iakovos Kalaitzakis: make up, photographer
Lefteris Neromiliotis (Sofita studio): mix engineer, sound engineer (baglama, bouzouki, cura)
Giorgos Segredakis: styling
The Flying Pot: artwork
Giorgos Theofanous: executive producer

References

2009 albums
Greek-language albums
Natasa Theodoridou albums
Sony Music Greece albums